People who used the name Judah HeHasid (Yehudah HeHasid, "Judah the Pious") include:

 Judah ben Samuel of Regensburg (12th-13th centuries), the initiator of the Chassidei Ashkenaz movement
 Judah HeHasid (Jerusalem) (around 1650–1700), a charismatic preacher who led the largest organized group of Jewish immigrants to the Land of Israel before modern Zionism.